Isopogon scabriusculus is a species of flowering plant in the family Proteaceae and is endemic to southwestern Western Australia. It is a shrub with cylindrical, or narrow flat, sometimes forked leaves, and spherical to oval heads of pink or red flowers.

Description

Taxonomy
Isopogon scabriusculus was first formally described in 1856 by Carl Meissner in de Candolle's Prodromus Systematis Naturalis Regni Vegetabilis. (Meissner had previously published the name Isopogon scabriusculus in 1852 but without a description.)

In 1995, Donald Bruce Foreman described three subspecies of I. scabriusculus in Flora of Australia and the names are accepted at the Australian Plant Census.

The specific epithet (scabriusculus) means "minutely scabrous", pubiflorus means "softly hairy-flowered" and stenophyllus means "narrow-leaved".

Distribution and habitat
Isopogon scabriusculus is widespread in the south-west of Western Australia where it grows on sandplains and ridges. Subspecies pubifloris grows in scrub, shrubland and woodland between Hyden, Southern Cross, Coolgardie, Lake King and the Frank Hann National Park. Subspecies scabriusculus grows in mallee, scrub and heath between Mullewa and Newdegate and subspecies stenophyllus grows in heath and shrubland, mainly between Wubin, Southern Cross and Newdegate.

Conservation status
All three subspecies of I. scabriusculus are classified as "not threatened" by the Western Australian Government Department of Parks and Wildlife.

References

scabriusculus
Eudicots of Western Australia
Plants described in 1856
Taxa named by Carl Meissner